Samrong Nuea, also popularly called for short Samrong is a tambon (sub-district) and neighbourhood of Mueang Samut Prakan District, Samut Prakan Province on eastern outskirts Bangkok.

Description 
Its name meaning "northern Samrong" after Khlong Samrong, a main watercourse flowing through the area.

The area is the northernmost part of the district. It borders Bang Na Tai in Bang Na District of Bangkok to the north.

Administration & population 
Samrong Nuea is part of the administrative area of Samrong Nuea Subdistrict Municipality.

The area also consists of nine administrative muban (village).

It has a total population of 55,389 people in 18,989 households.

Places 
Imperial World Samrong
Samrong General Hospital
Wat Dan Samrong
Mathayomwat Dansamrong School
Makro Srinagarindra

Transportation 
The area served by nearby the Bearing (E14) and Samrong Stations (E15) of the BTS skytrain, whose Sukhumvit Line runs above Sukhumvit Road (Highway 3).

Samrong Nuea is also a transit and departure point for many BMTA bus routes such as 2 (Samrong	– Pak Khlong Talat), 23 (Samrong – Thewet), 25 (Pak Nam – Sanam Luang), as well as a large number of songthaew (local bus).

Sukhumvit, Srinagarindra (Highway 3344), Bearing (Soi Sukhumvit 107), Thang Rotfai Sai Kao Paknam Roads are the main road.

See also 
Pu Chao Saming Phrai – adjacent area is collectively referred to as "Samrong" as well.

References

External links 

Tambon of Samut Prakan Province
Neighbourhoods in Thailand